is an inhabited island in Mikawa Bay on the Pacific coast of Japan. The island is administered as part of the town of  Minamichita in Aichi Prefecture, Japan. , the island's population was 1,653 inhabitants in 622 households. All of the island is within the borders of the Mikawa-wan Quasi-National Park.

Geography
Shinojima is located approximately 10 kilometers from either Chita Peninsula or Atsumi Peninsula and three kilometers south of Himakajima. The highest point on the island is 41.9 meters, and is located in approximately the center of the island. Settlement is concentrated in a single hamlet. The total area of the island is 0.94 square kilometers. The island is rocky, and is surrounded by numerous offshore rocks and reefs.

History
Shinojima has been inhabited since at least the Jōmon period, as archaeologists have found Yayoi period and Kofun period remains. Long associated with Ise Shrine, the island is mentioned in the Nara period Man'yōshū poetry anthology. It has supplied salted and dried sea bream to the shrine for use as offerings since before the Nara period. During the reconstruction of Ise Shrine every twenty years, one of the buildings from Ise Shrine is always dismantled and shipped to Shinojima, where it is re-erected as the honden of the local Shimmei Jinja, founded in 771 AD.  During the Edo period, it was part of the holdings of Owari Domain under the Tokugawa shogunate and contained a fishing settlement. Kato Kiyomasa is said to have used granite quarried on Shinojima in the construction of Nagoya Castle. With the establishment of the modern municipalities system after the start of the Meiji period, the island was organized as a village within Chita District, Aichi. It merged with surrounding towns and villages to form the town of Minamichita on June 1, 1961.

See also 
 List of islands of Japan

Notes

References
 Teikoku's Complete Atlas of Japan, Teikoku-Shoin., Ltd. Tokyo 1990,

External links

 Official Website

Islands of Aichi Prefecture
Minamichita, Aichi